Oh, You Tony! is a 1924 American silent comedy Western film directed by John G. Blystone and written by Donald W. Lee. The film stars Tom Mix, Claire Adams, Dick La Reno, Earle Foxe, Dolores Rousse and Charles K. French. The film was released on September 21, 1924, by Fox Film Corporation.

Cast        
 Tom Mix as Tom Masters
 Claire Adams as Betty Faine
 Dick La Reno as Mark Langdon
 Earle Foxe as Jim Overton
 Dolores Rousse as The Countess
 Charles K. French as Blakely
 Pat Chrisman as The Chief
 Miles McCarthy as Senator from Arizona
 Mathilde Brundage as Senator's Wife 
 May Wallace as Etiqutte Instructor 
 Tony the Horse as Tony

Preservation status
 This picture is preserved in the Library of Congress collection.

References

External links
 

1924 films
1920s Western (genre) comedy films
Fox Film films
Films directed by John G. Blystone
American black-and-white films
1924 comedy films
Silent American Western (genre) comedy films
1920s English-language films
1920s American films